The Tebrau River is a river in Johor, Malaysia.

See also
 Geography of Malaysia

References

Rivers of Johor